Flatabø is a surname. Notable people with the surname include:

Isak Larsson Flatabø (1896–1969), Norwegian politician
Jon Flatabø (1846–1930), Norwegian writer

Norwegian-language surnames